The Moscow Challenge was a track and field competition at the Luzhniki Stadium in Moscow, Russia as part of the IAAF World Challenge Meetings. The first edition took place in 2011 and it was last organized in 2014.

Meet records

Men

Women

References

External links
 Moscow Challenge web site

Annual track and field meetings
IAAF World Challenge
Recurring sporting events established in 2011